Roger Rosenblatt (born 1940) is an American memoirist, essayist, and novelist. He was a long-time essayist for Time magazine and PBS NewsHour.

Career
Roger Rosenblatt began writing professionally in his mid-30s, when he became literary editor and a columnist for The New Republic. Before that, he taught at Harvard, where he earned his Ph.D. In 1965–66 he was a Fulbright Scholar in Ireland, where he played on the Irish international basketball team. At age 25, he became the director of Harvard's freshman writing department. At age 28, he held the Briggs–Copeland appointment in the teaching of writing, and was Allston–Burr Senior Tutor, and later, Master of Dunster House. At age 29 he was the youngest House Master in Harvard's history. At Harvard, apart from creative writing, he taught Irish drama, modern poetry, and the university's first course in African American literature. In 2005 he was the Edward R. Murrow visiting professor at Harvard. In 2010 he was selected for the Robert Foster Cherry Award as one of the three most gifted university teachers in the country.

Before turning solely to literary work, he was a columnist on The Washington Post, during which time Washingtonian Magazine named him Best Columnist in Washington, and an essayist for the NewsHour on PBS. With Jim Lehrer and Robert MacNeil, he created the first essays ever done on television. In 1979 he became an essayist for Time magazine, a post that he held on and off until 2006. He continued to do TV essays for the NewsHour until that same year. His essays for Time won two George Polk Awards, awards from the Overseas Press Club, the American Bar Association, and others. His NewsHour essays won the Peabody Award and the Emmy. His Time cover essay, "A Letter to the Year 2086" was chosen for the time capsule placed inside the Statue of Liberty at its centennial. In 1985, he was on the short list for NASA's Journalist in Space before the program was ended by the Challenger shuttle tragedy. He argued in a 1999 article for Time that guns should be banned.

As Senior Writer at Time he became the first to report his own stories—the functions of reporting and writing having been separate previously. "Here you had a superstar writer becoming a superstar reporter," wrote executive editor Jason McManus. Under managing editor Ray Cave, Rosenblatt also wrote the magazine's first "tone poems," brief interpretive essays introducing cover stories. His essay "The Man in the Water," on the self-sacrificing hero of the Air Florida plane crash in 1981, was read by President Reagan at a ceremony honoring the man. Besides Rosenblatt's essays, his other prominent pieces included covers on the 40th anniversary of Hiroshima, on the Los Angeles Olympics, on a family services organization in Brooklyn, and the essay accompanying the photographs in "A Day in the Life of the Soviet Union." Rosenblatt's 25,000-word "Children of War," on the thoughts and lives of children in the war zones of Northern Ireland, Israel, Lebanon, Cambodia, and Vietnam was "one of the most poignant stories Time ever published" and was noted worldwide. Later, he wrote about wars in Sudan (for Vanity Fair), and Rwanda (for New York Times Magazine).

In 2006 Rosenblatt left his positions at Time and the NewsHour and gave up journalism to devote his time to the writing of memoirs, novels and extended essays. His first novel, Lapham Rising, was a national bestseller. Making Toast was a New York Times bestseller. The memoir was a book-length version of an essay he wrote for the New Yorker magazine, on the death of his daughter, in 2008. The L.A. Times called Making Toast "sad, funny, brave and luminous. A rare and generous book." The Washington Post described it as "a textbook on what constitutes perfect writing and how to be a class act." He followed Making Toast with Unless It Moves the Human Heart, a book on the art and craft of writing, which was also a New York Times bestseller, as was Kayak Morning, a meditation on grief. The Boy Detective: A New York Childhood was published in 2013. The Book of Love: Improvisations on That Crazy Little Thing was published in January 2015. His novel, Thomas Murphy, was published in January, 2016. His two most recent books are Cold Moon: On Life, Love, and Responsibility (2020) and Cataract Blues: Running the Keyboard (2023). 

Of Cold Moon, The Washington Post wrote: "In this deceptively short book, the celebrated author and essayist takes us on a tour of his 'weathered mind.' His memories of his life summon ours, without warning or apology. Line by line, he helps us find softer landings... He never mentions [the pandemic], and yet he does... 'Everybody grieves.' So many lost, with many more to die... Let us abide by Rosenblatt's No. 3. We are responsible for each other." Kirkus Reviews wrote: "In brief passages connected by associations and the improvisational feel of jazz [Rosenblatt] moves fluidly among memoir, philosophy, natural history and inspiration... A tonic for tough times filled with plain spoken lyricism, gratitude, and good humor."

Of Cataract Blues, Garry Trudeau wrote: "While everyone around you is seeing red, along comes a happy outpatient who's just nuts about the color blue. Prompted by his wildly successful eye surgery, Roger Rosenblatt celebrates his new favorite wavelength by letting it wash over everything that matters — nature, history, music, memory, laughter, loss, and love. This is a master, at work and at play." 

In total, he is the author of 21 books, which have been published in 14 languages. They include the national bestseller Rules for Aging; three collections of essays; and Children of War, based on his story in Time, which won the Robert F. Kennedy Book Prize and was a finalist for the National Book Critics Circle Award.

He has also written six off-Broadway plays, including Ashley Montana Goes Ashore in the Caicos, and The Oldsmobiles, both produced at the Flea Theater. His comic one-man show, Free Speech in America, which he performed at the American Place Theater, was cited by the New York Times as one of the 10 best plays of 1991. His most recent play, performed at the Bay Street Theater in Sag Harbor (2019), was “Lives in the Basement, Does Nothing,” a musical monologue on the art of writing, for which he sang and played piano.

William Safire of the New York Times wrote that Roger Rosenblatt’s work represents “some of the most profound and stylish writing in America today.” Vanity Fair said that he “set new standards of thought and compassion” in journalism. The Philadelphia Inquirer cited his essays for “unparalleled elegance and wit.”  Kirkus Reviews noted, "He has excelled in nearly every literary form." UPI (United Press International) called him “a national treasure.”

In his recent books, Rosenblatt has experimented with a form of narrative that connects section to section, without chapter demarcations, dismissing chronological time, and mixing fact and fiction. The effect he seeks is akin to movements in music. In his review of The Boy Detective in the New York Times Book Review, Pete Hamill compared Rosenblatt's style to that of "a great jazz musician...moving from one emotion to another, playing some with a dose of irony, others with joy, and a few with pain and melancholy (the blues, of course). Alone with the instrument of his art, he seems to be hoping only to surprise himself." The Kirkus Review of The Book of Love said, "His wanderings with the subject of love are like Coltrane at the Village Vanguard. When you hear it, you know."

In November 2015, Rosenblatt received the 2015 Kenyon Review Award for Literary Achievement. In June, 2016, he was awarded the President's Medal of the Chautauqua Institution for the artistic and moral quality of his body of work. Seven universities have awarded him honorary doctorates. 

In 2018, he launched a podcast: Word for Word with Roger Rosenblatt. In 2021, he was honored by the Fulbright Association on its 75th Anniversary. Also in 2021, he founded Write America, a national reading series broadcast weekly by writers devoted to healing divisions in the country.

Books
Cataract Blues—2023
Cold Moon—2020
The Story I Am—2020
Thomas Murphy—2016
The Book of Love—2015
The Boy Detective: A New York Childhood—2013
Kayak Morning—2012
Unless it Moves the Human Heart: The Art and Craft of Writing—2011
Making Toast—2010
Beet - 2008
Lapham Rising—2006
Anything Can Happen—2004
Where We Stand: 30 Reasons for Loving Our Country—2002
Rules for Aging—2000
Consuming Desires: Consumption, Culture and the Pursuit of Happiness—1999
Coming Apart: A Memoir of the Harvard Wars of 1969—1997
The Man In The Water—1994
Life Itself: Abortion in the American Mind—1992
Witness: The World Since Hiroshima—1985
Children of War—1983
Black Fiction—1974

References

External links

Living people
Harvard University alumni
Harvard University faculty
Stony Brook University faculty
The American Spectator people
The New Republic people
Time (magazine) people
1940 births
American male journalists